The GS&WR Class 201 was a class of ten  locomotives designed by Locomotive Engineer, Henry Ivatt in 1887 for shunting heavy goods trains at Kingsbridge and Cork yards. Although the design is generally attributed to Ivatt they were actually created in the last year of Alexander McDonnell's tenure.  The locomotives were built in three batch with variations between batches: Nos. 207—210 were introduced in 1887; 201 and 202 followed in 1895 taking numbers formerly held by Sambo and Negro; while the final batch 214—217 emerged in 1901.

Design

The decision to proceed with an  design was discussed between Ivatt and John Aspinall due to issues with preceding  locomotives.  Ivatt's design incorporated the same cylinders, coupled-wheels and boilers as the s.

Service

Constraints on the locomotive design meant that the coupled wheelbase had to be as short as possible to negotiate the curves in the dock areas but the locomotive had to have sufficient power available for the increasing load of the trains.

Under the system employed by the Great Southern Railways they became Class J11. All of the class survived until 1949, with No. 217 being withdrawn in 1961 and No. 201 withdrawn in 1963.

References

Footnotes

Sources
 
 
 
 
 

0-6-0T locomotives
Steam locomotives of Ireland
Railway locomotives introduced in 1887
5 ft 3 in gauge locomotives
Scrapped locomotives